Fredericksburg Town Hall and Market Square, also known as the Fredericksburg Area Museum, is a historic town hall and public market space located in Fredericksburg, Virginia.

History 
It was built between 1814 and 1816, and consists of a two-story, five bay, rectangular center block with flanking one-story rectangular wings in the Federal style. The brick building has stone steps fanning the front of the structure. The building has large sandstone arches in the back that open to the Market Square. Market Square is a paved area that abuts the rear of the building. The building housed city offices until 1982.

It was listed on the National Register of Historic Places in 1994.  It is located in the Fredericksburg Historic District.

Fredericksburg Area Museum 
In 2020, the Fredericksburg Area Museum re-opened after a renovation. It is exhibiting “Hometown Teams: How Sports Shape America.” from the Smithsonian Institution traveling exhibit service.

References

External links
Fredericksburg Area Museum website

City and town halls on the National Register of Historic Places in Virginia
Federal architecture in Virginia
Government buildings completed in 1816
Buildings and structures in Fredericksburg, Virginia
Buildings and structures on the National Register of Historic Places in Virginia

National Register of Historic Places in Fredericksburg, Virginia
1816 establishments in Virginia
Individually listed contributing properties to historic districts on the National Register in Virginia